John O. Thomas was an American politician. He was a member of the Wisconsin State Assembly.

Biography
Thomas was born on November 23, 1867 in Caledonia, Wisconsin. He would become a farmer there. Thomas was affiliated with Presbyterianism. He died on February 2, 1961.

Political career
Thomas was elected to the Assembly in 1904 and 1906. Previously, he had been town clerk of Caledonia, now a village, from 1896 to 1899. He was a Republican.

References

People from Caledonia, Wisconsin
Republican Party members of the Wisconsin State Assembly
City and town clerks
American Presbyterians
20th-century Presbyterians
Farmers from Wisconsin
1867 births
1961 deaths